The Novgorod Codex is the oldest book of the Rus’, unearthed on July 13, 2000 in Novgorod. It is a palimpsest consisting of three bound wooden tablets containing four pages filled with wax, on which its former owner wrote down dozens, probably hundreds of texts during two or three decades, each time wiping out the preceding text.

According to the data obtained by stratigraphy (and dendrochronology), carbon dating and from the text itself (where the year 999 occurs several times), the wax codex was used in the first quarter of the 11th century and maybe even in the last years of the 10th century. It is therefore older than the Ostromir Gospels, the earliest precisely dated East Slavic book.

Discovery and description 

Since 1932 the ancient Russian city of Novgorod has been continuously excavated by the Novgorod Archaeological Expedition started by Artemiy Artsikhovsky. Since the early 1970s the excavations focused on the Troitza (Trinity) area of the ancient Ludin part of town, covering nearly 6,000 square meters (64,500 square feet). The area excavated housed affluent mansions and a large 1,200 square meter (13,000 sq ft) communal building housed a court house and a Novgorod city treasury. The vast majority of text found in Novgorod were birch bark manuscripts; wax tablets were extremely uncommon.

On July 13, 2000, the expedition headed by prof. Valentin Yanin discovered three wooden wax tablets in the soil. The tablets were 19 x 15 x 1 cm, and they have a 15 x 11.5 cm indentation filled with wax. Two of the tablets have one wax layer and one blank wooden side, and a third tablet has two wax sides. The boards have round holes at one edge, through which wooden pegs were inserted, holding the tablets together as a four-page book.

The tablets were discovered in a stratum 50 cm away and 30 cm below a wooden walkway dendrochronologically dated to the year 1036. As the strata in Novgorod are estimated to have grown at about 1 cm per year, the document was estimated to have been placed there around 1015-1020. Subsequent radiocarbon dating of the wax at the Uppsala University in Sweden gave the range of 760 AD to 1030 AD with a 95.4% certainty. Due to the Christian text on the tablets, dates earlier than the Christianization of Kievan Rus' in 988 are considered unlikely, and as such, the wax tablets are reliably dated to a very narrow 42-year window between 988 and 1030 AD.

Basic text 

The wax of the codex itself contains psalms 75 and 76 (and a small fragment of psalm 67). This is the so-called basic text of the Novgorod Codex. Consequently, the book is alternatively known as the Novgorod Psalter. This text can be read as easily as any other document on parchment and could be examined at once. The Psalter translation exhibits a somewhat different translatory tradition than the Slavonic translations of the Psalter known so far (especially the Psalterium Sinaiticum).

Language 

The language of the Novgorod Codex is a very regular (especially in the basic text) Church Slavonic, albeit with some 'mistakes' in the rendition of the yus letters betraying the author's East Slavic origin. The whole text was written by the same hand in a so-called 'monoyeric' orthography (Russian одноеровая система письма), i.e. instead of the two yer letters ь and ъ only ъ is used; before the codex discovery, the monoyeric system was considered to have been a late invention, with the dualyeric system being the original; the discovery proved that the reverse was the case.

Preservation and reading method
Preservation of the tablets presented unique challenges, as the usual preservation method for wood would have destroyed the wax layer, and vice versa. The method eventually decided on called for careful separation of the wax layer, and preserving each material separately. The newly exposed wood under the removed wax was found to have been extensively scratched by the stylus cutting through the thin wax. It took the research team several weeks to realize that some symbols could be discerned in the scratches.

Russian linguist Andrey Zaliznyak, one of the foremost experts on the early medieval Novgorod dialect, has taken tremendous effort to reconstruct so far only a small portion of the texts preceding the basic text. The main difficulty with this task is the fact that the feeble traces of dozens of thousands of letters left by the stylus, often hardly discernible from the natural shading of the soft lime wood, have been superimposed on each other, producing an impenetrable labyrinth of lines (Zaliznyak speaks of a “hyper-palimpsest”). Consequently, ‘reading’ a single concealed text of one page can take weeks.

According to Zaliznyak, reading the concealed texts in the scratches is a unique challenge unlike anything attempted by any research team previously. The very compact surface of the four writing surfaces contains traces of thousands of texts, estimated to have been written over several decades. As such, the stylus traces form a constant mesh of lines across the entire surface. To complicate the process, they are also all written by a single hand, making handwriting analysis impossible. As such, Zaliznyak does not call the process 'reading'; instead, he calls it 'reconstruction'. Instead of asking himself the question, 'what's written on this line', Zaliznyak approaches the problem as 'is a phrase A or a word B possible among everything written in this sector'.

The reconstruction is therefore done letter by letter, starting from an arbitrary position, usually somewhere at the top of a 'page'. After analyzing a meshwork of scratches and identifying some of the letters in a given spot (which can realistically number hundreds or even thousands), Zaliznyak then moves some distance to the side and begins identifying symbols at the next position. After several positions are discerned in that way, most letter combinations are discarded as senseless jumble, and possibly meaningful words are identified. Zaliznyak then moves to the next position and attempts to locate subsequent symbols that would complete the word or a sentence. As the text, in a typical fashion for the writing of the time, is written with no spaces between words, identifying these chains becomes somewhat easier compared to if it had been written with spaces.

After careful examination of each position, Zaliznyak creates symbol chains that continue to grow in size. The search often branches off into false leads, where at a certain symbol the chains switch off to a different text fragment. Sometimes these false branches are identified after only a few symbols, but sometimes the false branches can take several words, sentences, and even longer to be discounted. Such false leads can take several days or even weeks to identify.

Another specific of the texts is that many of them have been written multiple times, for reasons that can only be guessed at. Due to the previous copy being erased before a new copy is made, each repetition is written somewhat shifted compared to the previous copy. It is unknown whether the copies were made right after each other, or weeks, months or even years apart. Multiple copies of the same text make identifying false chains easier.

The process remains exceedingly hard to peer-review. Only small portions of Zaliznyak's texts have been peer-reviewed to this time, as no research team came forward that was willing to learn and repeat the process over the length of a large text. Linguist Izabel Vallotton of Geneva cooperated with Zaliznyak on some portions of the reconstruction, where Zaliznyak identified a portion of the chain and passed it on to Vallotton, with both of them then continuing to independently reconstruct the text. In the experiment, both Vallotton and Zaliznyak ended up with completely identical chains, matching to the letter, but the chains were admittedly short, only 20-30 symbols long.

Finally, a problem Zaliznyak considers unsolvable is identifying spelling errors or Russisms in the Church Slavonic. Often, the position where an error or deviation from Church Slavonic is possible, a correct symbol or symbols will also be present alongside an erroneous one, in which case Zaliznyak always assumes the original text was correctly written. In some cases, such assumptions will of course be incorrect. These multiple possibilities may also be the original author's correcting himself by erasing a mistake with his stylus and writing in a correct symbol.

Concealed texts and identity of the owner

One of the first concealed texts reconstructed was an unnamed text Zaliznyak called Instruction on Forgiveness of Sins. Its introduction is written in first person by somebody who identifies himself as 'Alexander, the Areopagite of Thracia, of Laodicean origins (birth)'. The text contains a highly unorthodox prayer, reading 'we pray to thee father Alexander, forgive us our sins by your will and give us salvation and the food of paradise, amen'. In it, this Alexander therefore assumes powers usually reserved to God alone. The prayer is followed by prophecies by the same Alexander, who then calls for people to 'leave your villages and homes' and to walk the earth, spreading Alexander's message. Alexander then says 'whoever listens to me, listens to Peter'. This is followed by a highly original call following along the lines of 'leave your villages and homes', with dozens of phrases starting with 'leave your' and listing a great number of things to leave, all starting with a Slavic prefix 'raz-': разлады, раздоры, расклады, развозы, распловы, разлогы, разлеты, размеры, размолвы, and so on (troubles, strifes, positions, moving around, sailing, flying, sizes, disagreements, etc.). This highly original sequence leads Zaliznyak to believe that the text was originally composed in Church Slavonic, as it is hard to imagine that translation from a foreign language could follow such a neat Slavic pattern.

A subsequent concealed text contains the following passage: 'The world is a town in which live the Armenians and the Africans and the Thracians and the Italians and the Spanish and the Greeks'. Zaliznyak believes that an earlier allusion to Alexander, the Areopagite of Thracia is connected to the listing of Thracians early in the list.

Finally, another text that Zaliznyak calls “Spiritual Instruction from the Father and the Mother to the Son” contains the following note “Въ лѣто ҂ѕ҃ф҃з҃ азъ мънихъ исаакии поставленъ попомъ въ соужъдали въ цръкъве свѧтаго александра арменина…” (“In 6507 [i.e. 999] I, monk Isaakiy, was posted as a priest in Suzdal, at the church of St. Alexander the Armenian…”). The year 6507/999 reappears several times on the margins, and is the only numerical sequence identified in the text.

“Spiritual Instruction from the Father and the Mother to the Son” continues onto increasingly more gloomy analysis of the state of the world, showing that the writer identifies with people excluded from the official church for believing unorthodox teachings.

Zaliznyak therefore postulates that the writer was this monk Isaakiy, who followed a previously unknown schismatic teaching of a self-proclaimed prophet Alexander, an Armenian by birth, and that Alexander himself was based in Thracia, and Isaakiy was sent to spread Alexander's word in Suzdal. The 'church of St. Alexander', according to Zaliznyak, does not mean a physical church building, but rather a church in the sense of teachings or doctrine. As there were no monasteries anywhere in Rus during the time these texts were written, Zaliznyak believes that Isaakiy was taught outside of Rus, and became a monk elsewhere. He was likely a witness to the Christianization of Kievan Rus' in 988, and operated in a still largely pagan Rus of the early 11th century. The concealed texts contain a conversion prayer, which in first person singular and plural (I and we) denies idolatry and accepts Christianity, so it is likely Isaakiy himself converted pagan Slavs.

The teachings of Alexander the Armenian were likely an early form of Bogomilism. The Nikonian Chronicle contains a mention of a schismatic monk Andreyan jailed for disagreeing with the official church in 1004, during the timeframe the codex texts were written. According to Evgeniy Golubinskiy, this Andreyan was a Bogomil. So the Novgorod Bogomil codex being found in the vicinity of a courthouse in the early 11th century therefore leads to some theories.

Finally, a feature of the texts is common allusions to the city of Laodicea, without any direct references to any events there. Zaliznyak believes that Laodicea was a sort of a secret word among the Bogomils, which identified a Bogomil teaching to other believers, without making anything apparent to outsiders. In this context, the strange title of a schismatic work written 500 years later by a Fyodor Kuritsyn, The Message of Laodicea, takes on a new light.

List of texts
The following concealed texts, among others, have been found so far:

 a multitude of psalms, written down several times each
 the beginning of the Apocalypse of John
 the beginning of a translation of the treatise “On virginity” by John Chrysostom, of which a Slavonic translation had not been known
 a multitude of examples of the alphabet, in a short version (а б в г д е ж ѕ з и ї к л м н о п р с т оу ф х ц ч ш щ ѿ) and a full version (а б в г д е ж ѕ з и ї к л м н о п р с т оу ф х ц ч ш щ ѿ ъ ѣ ѫ ѭ ю ꙗ ѧ ѿ) as well as with an enumeration of the letter names (азъ боукы вѣдѣ глаголи…)
 the tetralogy “From Paganism to Christ” (title from Zaliznyak): four so far unknown texts titled “Moses’ Law" (Russian “Закон Моисеев”), “The Unstrengthening and the Unpeacing” (“Размаряющие и размиряющие”), “Archangel Gabriel” (“Архангел Гавриил”), and “Jesus Christ’s Law” (“Закон Иисуса Христа”).
 a fragment of the so far unknown text “On the Concealed Church of Our Saviour Jesus Christ in Laodicea and On the Laodicean Prayer of Our Lord Jesus Christ”
 a fragment of the so far unknown text “Tale of the Apostle Paul on Moses’ Secret Patericon”
 a fragment of the so far unknown text “Instruction by Alexander of Laodicea on Forgiveness of Sins”
 a fragment of the so far unknown text “Spiritual Instruction from the Father and the Mother to the Son”

The great number of so far unknown texts in the Novgorod Codex might be explained by the fact that the writer belonged to a Christian community declared heretical by the ‘official’ church — probably a dualistic group similar to the Bogomils. After the ‘official’ church had prevailed, the sect’s texts were no longer copied and most traces of the existence of this heresy were erased. An especially symptomatic example of the scribe’s attitude to the ‘official’ church is the following excerpt from the “Spiritual Instruction from the Father and the Mother to the Son”:

Work on the Novgorod Codex is continuing. Scholarly literature, so far published only in Russian, is listed in the Russian Wikipedia article.

See also 
 Palimpsest

References

Notes

Sources

 A.A. Zaliznyak, V.L. Yanin, Vestnik Rossijskoi akademii nauk, tom 71, № 3, s. 202—209, 2001 g.
 Zaliznyak A. A., Yanin V. L. Novgorodskij kodeks pervoi chetverti XI v. — drevneishaya kniga Rusi. // Voprosy yazykoznaniya. — 2001. — № 5. — S. 3—25.
 Zaliznyak A. A. Tetralogiya «Ot yazychestva k Hristu» iz Novgorodskogo kodeksa XI veka. // Russkij yazyk v nauchnom osveschenii. — № 2 (4), 2002. — S. 35—56.
 Sobolev A. N. Novgorodskaya psaltyr' XI veka i ee antigraf // Voprosy yazykoznaniya. — 2003. — S. 113—143.
 Zaliznyak A. A. Problemy izucheniya Novgorodskogo kodeksa XI veka, naidennogo v 2000 g. // Slavyanskoe yazykoznanie. XIII Mezhdunarodnyi s'ezd slavistov. Lyublyana, 2003 g. Doklady rossijskoi delegatsii. — Moskva, 2003. — S. 190—212.

Church Slavonic manuscripts
East Slavic manuscripts
Old Church Slavonic language
Novgorod Republic
Earliest known manuscripts by language
Cultural history of Russia
Bogomilism
11th-century biblical manuscripts
Old East Slavic inscriptions
History of Novgorod Oblast
Cyrillic manuscripts